Roy Vence (born 22 February 1966) is a Filipino long-distance runner. He competed in the men's marathon at the 1996 Summer Olympics.

References

1966 births
Living people
Athletes (track and field) at the 1996 Summer Olympics
Filipino male long-distance runners
Filipino male marathon runners
Olympic track and field athletes of the Philippines
Southeast Asian Games medalists in athletics
Place of birth missing (living people)
Southeast Asian Games gold medalists for the Philippines
Athletes (track and field) at the 2002 Asian Games
Competitors at the 2001 Southeast Asian Games
Asian Games competitors for the Philippines